Roy Bruno Barni (February 15, 1927 – July 22, 1957) was an American football defensive back in the National Football League for the Chicago Cardinals, Philadelphia Eagles, and the Washington Redskins.  He played college football at the University of San Francisco.

He intercepted 11 passes during his career including six when playing with the Cardinals in 1952. Barni, who played for the Redskins in 1955 and 1956, was shot and killed in a bar in San Francisco prior to the 1957 season.

References

1927 births
1957 deaths
Players of American football from San Francisco
American football defensive backs
Washington Redskins players
Chicago Cardinals players
Philadelphia Eagles players
San Francisco Dons football players